Dominique Boschero (born 27 April 1937) is a French-Italian actress.

Life and career 
Born in Paris by Italian parents, Boschero spent her childhood in Frassino, Italy with her grandparents until the age of 15, when she returned to Paris. After debuting on stage and in films in the mid-1950s, in 1960 she moved back in Italy, where she became a star of genre films, with occasional performances in dramatic and humorous roles. In the 1970s she slowed her activities, retiring in the mid-1970s. She currently lives in Frassino.

Selected filmography 

 Women's Club (1956)
 The Bride Is Much Too Beautiful (1956)
 Un dollaro di fifa (1960)
 The Hot Port of Hong Kong (1962)
 The Golden Arrow (1962)
 Ulysses Against the Son of Hercules (1962)
 Mare matto (1963)
 The Reunion (1963)
 The Swindlers (1964)
 The Secret of the Chinese Carnation (1964)
 La donnaccia (1964)
 Secret Agent Fireball (1965)
 Spiaggia libera (1965)
 OSS 77 – Operazione fior di loto (1965)
 The Double Bed (1965)
 I Kill, You Kill (1965)
 Libido (1965)
 Ring Around the World (1966)
 The Fantastic Argoman (1967) 
 Fire of Love (1967)
 The Curse of Belphegor (1967)
 Train for Durango (1968)
 Between God, the Devil and a Winchester (1968)
 The Unnaturals - Contronatura (1969)
 And the Crows Will Dig Your Grave (1971)
 The Blonde in the Blue Movie (1971)
 Gang War (1971)
 Il sindacalista (1972)
 Who Saw Her Die? (1972)
 All the Colors of the Dark (1972)
 Il prato macchiato di rosso (1973)
 Lovers and Other Relatives (1974)
 Faccia di spia (1975)

References

External links 
 

Actresses from Paris
French film actresses
Italian film actresses
French stage actresses
1937 births
20th-century French actresses
20th-century Italian actresses
Living people
French people of Italian descent